The 2001 Cornwall County Council election, was an election for all 79 seats on the council. Cornwall County Council was a county council that covered the majority of the ceremonial county of Cornwall, with the exception of the Isles of Scilly which had an independent local authority. The elections took place concurrently with other local elections across England and Northern Ireland. The council remained under no overall control, with the Liberal Democrats as the largest party.

Election result 

|}

References

External links 

2001 English local elections
2001
2000s in Cornwall